The Klickitat River is a tributary of the Columbia River, nearly  long, in south-central Washington in the United States.  It drains a rugged plateau area on the eastern side of the Cascade Range northeast of Portland, Oregon.  In 1986,  of the river were designated Wild and Scenic from the confluence with Wheeler Creek, near the town of Pitt, to the confluence with the Columbia River.

Course
The Klickitat River rises in the high Cascades near Gilbert Peak, in northwestern Yakima County, in a remote corner of the Yakama Indian Reservation. It flows southeast, then generally south across the  Lincoln Plateau. It enters northern Klickitat County, and meanders south through steep canyons. State Route 142 follows the lower  of the river. The river is bridged by State Route 14 at its mouth.

Recreation

See also

List of Washington rivers
Tributaries of the Columbia River
List of National Wild and Scenic Rivers
Outlet Falls

References

External links
Wild and Scenic Klickitat River - National Wild and Scenic Rivers System

Rivers of Washington (state)
Columbia River Gorge
Tributaries of the Columbia River
Wild and Scenic Rivers of the United States
Washington Natural Areas Program
Rivers of Klickitat County, Washington
Rivers of Yakima County, Washington
Protected areas of Yakima County, Washington
Mount Adams (Washington)